Rukku Priya Nahar (born 28 February 1996) is a British actress, known for her roles as Selina Khan on the CBBC series Wolfblood and Habiba Ahmed on the BBC soap opera EastEnders.

Early life
Nahar was born on 28 February 1996 in Bedford, England. Nahar is British of Indian-Punjabi descent.  Whilst growing up, Nahar attended Hastingsbury Upper School, and later trained at the Identity School of Acting.

Career
In 2014, Nahar made her professional acting debut in an episode of the YouTube comedy series Corner Shop Show, as Meena. In 2016, she began portraying the role of Selina Khan in the CBBC drama series Wolfblood, a role she played for two series. Later in 2016, she appeared in an episode of the BBC medical drama Casualty. In 2017, she made her film debut in the adventure film We Can Be Heroes, as Zara Muhammed. In 2018, Nahar made an appearance in an episode of the BBC soap opera Doctors as Rana Khan. Later that year, she starred in nine episodes of the Channel 4 soap opera Hollyoaks, as Asha Kaur. In February 2019, Nahar began appearing in the BBC soap opera EastEnders as series regular Habiba Ahmed. On 22 October 2020, Nahar made her final appearance as Habiba in previously unannounced scenes. Nahar confirmed her exit on Instagram, where she thanked EastEnders for teaching her "so much" during her tenure, and stated that she was "grateful" for the friendships she made on the programme.

Filmography

References

External links
 

1996 births
21st-century English actresses
Actresses from Bedfordshire
British actresses of Indian descent
English people of Punjabi descent
English soap opera actresses
English television actresses
Living people
People from Bedford